John Hutchinson, OBE, FRS (7 April 1884 Blindburn, Northumberland – 2 September 1972 London) was an English botanist, taxonomist and author.

Life and career
Born in Blindburn, Wark on Tyne, Northumberland, England, he received his horticultural training in Northumberland and Durham and was appointed a student gardener at Kew in 1904. His taxonomic and drawing skills were soon noticed and resulted in his being appointed to the Herbarium in 1905. He moved from assistant in the Indian section to assistant for Tropical Africa, returning to Indian botany from 1915 to 1919, and from then on was in charge of the African section until 1936 when he was appointed Keeper of the Museums of Botany at Kew. He retired in 1948 but continued working on the phylogeny of flowering plants and publishing two parts of The Genera of Flowering Plants.

John Hutchinson proposed a radical revision of the angiosperm classification systems devised by Joseph Dalton Hooker and that of Adolf Engler and Karl Anton Eugen Prantl which had become widely accepted during the 20th century. At its simplest, his system suggested two main divisions of angiosperms, herbaceous and woody.

Hutchinson made two extended collecting trips to South Africa, which were recounted in great detail in A Botanist in Southern Africa. His first visit was from August 1928 to April 1929, and the second from June 1930 to September 1930 on which occasion the expedition travelled north as far as Lake Tanganyika.

Awards
 He was awarded an honorary degree of LL.D. by University of St Andrews in 1934.
 Awarded Veitch Memorial Medal in 1937.
 Awarded the Victoria Medal (horticulture) in 1944 for outstanding contributions to horticulture.  
 Awarded Linnaean Gold Medal in 1968. 
 He was awarded the Linnean Society of London's Darwin-Wallace Medal in 1958.
 He was elected Honorary Fellow of the Association for Tropical Biology and Conservation (ATBC) in 1965
 He was elected a Fellow of the Royal Society (FRS) in 1947
 Awarded O.B.E. shortly before his death
 Commemorated in the genus Hutchinsonia Robyns.

Personal life
Hutchinson was married and had two sons and three daughters, one of whom lived in South Africa. He spent his leisure time roaming the English countryside with his wife in a caravan drawing wild flowers.

At his funeral a wreath largely made of South African flowers was sent by his colleagues at the Royal Botanical Gardens, Kew.

First Southern Africa trip August 1928 – April 1929
Hutchinson arrived in Table Bay and spent the first few weeks collecting in and around Cape Town and Table Mountain, with short trips further afield. His first lengthy trip was to Namaqualand and Bushmanland with fellow botanist and succulent specialist, Neville Stuart Pillans. Back in Cape Town he purchased a small Citroën car and set off on 30 October in the company of Rudolf Marloth, who left them at Barrydale, and Jan Gillett, the son of Arthur Gillett at the University of Oxford (one of the founders of Oxfam). On this occasion their route followed the southern Cape coast as far as Port Elizabeth. Here Gillett's place was taken by Robert Allen Dyer and the route veered inland to Grahamstown and Katberg, then back to the coast, visiting Butterworth, Port St Johns, Kokstad, Pietermaritzburg and Durban. From here Hutchinson travelled on his own and in Pretoria joined up with General Smuts, who was a keen and knowledgeable botanist, to the far northern Transvaal to explore Lake Fundudzi, sacred to the Venda people.

16–22 August 1928 Cape Peninsula
25 August Worcester
31 August Matjesfontein
4 September Malmesbury to Darling
5 September Hopefield to Vredenburg
6 September coast north of Saldanha Bay
10 September Hottentots Holland Mountains
16 September above Tulbagh Waterfall
21 September Sir Lowry's Pass
30 September gorge west of Ceres
5 October lighthouse at Sea Point
9 October Sutherland to Middlepost
10 October near Elandsfontein
11 October near Nieuwoudtville
13 October near Bitterfontein
13 October Garies to Kamieskroon
15 October O'okiep to Steinkopf
16 October poort between Concordia and Pella
16 October Pella to Pofadder
18 October Kenhardt
27 October Bain's Kloof
29 October Paarl
30 October Robertson
31 October Montagu to Barrydale
1 November Waterkloof, Ladismith
1 November Seweweekspoort
2 November Calitzdorp to Cango
3 November southern side of Swartberg Pass
4 November Oudtshoorn to Montagu Pass
5 November Pacaltsdorp
5 November Touws River near George
5 November Phantom Pass near Knysna
7 November Belvedere near Knysna
8 November Plettenberg Bay
8 November Bitou River
9 November Keurbooms River
9 November Grootrivier Pass
10 November Witelsbos
12 November Kareedouw Pass
12 November Kareedouw to Humansdorp
13 November Jeffreys Bay
14 November Gamtoos River Pass
16 November Port Elizabeth to Uitenhage
16 November near Addo
17 November Howieson's Poort near Grahamstown
18 November Bathurst
19 November Fish River Valley
19 November Pluto's Vale
20 November Botha's Hill
26 November Grahamstown to Fort Beaufort
26 November hills above Balfour
27 November top of Katberg
28 November Seymour to Alice
28 November King William's Town to East London
29 November Mooiplaats to Komgha
1 December Libode
1 December mountain forest near Port St Johns
3 December Port St Johns to Lusikisiki
3 December Flagstaff
4 December Flagstaff to Kokstad
5 December Mt Currie
6 December Pietermaritzburg Botanical Garden
6 December Umgeni
10 December Howick, Mooi River
11 December Ladysmith, Natal
14 December Warmbaths
15 December near Potgietersrust
16 December Louis Trichardt to Wylliespoort
18 December Limpopo River near Messina
19 December Dongola
21 December Thomson's Store to Lake Fundudzi
23 December Witvlag
23 December Woodbush near Tzaneen
24 December Moorddrift
28 December koppie at Fountains Valley near Pretoria
31 December Hartebeespoort in the Magaliesberg
2 January 1929 Doornkloof near Irene
5 January Louw's Creek to Maid of the Mist Mountain
7 January Barberton to Louw's Creek
7 January Barberton to Lomati Falls
8 January Impala Siding near Barberton
9 January Komatipoort
9 January western slopes of Lebombo Mountains, Portuguese East Africa
15 January Horn's Nek, Magaliesberg
22 January between Potgietersrust and Swerwerskraal
23 January Magalakwin River Bridge
24 January north of Blaauwberg
29 January Premier Mine near Pretoria
30 January between Arnot and Belfast
2 February Machadodorp
3 February Maskew's farm Suikerboskop near Belfast
6 February Magatosnek near Rustenburg
7 February Rustenburg to Zeerust
8 February hills north of Zeerust
9 February 15 miles west of Mafeking
10 February Vryburg to Schweizer-Reneke
11 February Wolmaransstad and Klerksdorp
15 February near Parys, Orange Free State
18 February Christiana to Warrenton
19 February koppies near Kimberley
20 February Kimberley to Riverton
21 February Baviaanskrantz near Kaap Plateau
22 February hills between Papkuil and Postmasburg
23 February hills east of Asbestos Mountains
24 February near Campbell
28 February Kaffir River to Edenburg, Orange Free State
1 March Fauresmith Reserve
3 March near Colesberg
4 March Kikvorsch Mountains near Noupoort
6 March near Tafelberg, Middelburg, Cape Province
8 March Roode Hoogte Pass
8 March Naude's Pass
9 March Groote River to Aberdeen
10 March Meiringspoort
13 March George
15 March Mossel Bay
24 March Robinson Pass
25 March Riviersonderend
26 March Caledon to Hermanus
5 April Table Mountain
9 April Zeekoevlei

Second African trip June 1930 – September 1930
Having met Hutchinson on his previous visit to South Africa, General Smuts invited him to join a party consisting of Margaret Clark Gillett with two of her sons, Jan and Anthony, on a trip to Lake Tanganyika. They set off from Irene on 28 June 1930 in a convoy of seven vehicles and were joined at Beit Bridge by Illtyd Buller Pole-Evans. They collected all the way to Lake Tanganyika and then retraced their route to Broken Hill, where Hutchinson boarded a goods train to Elizabethville (Lubumbashi). On his return to Pretoria, and with time in hand, he set off on a trip to the Soutpansberg with Jan Gillett. Then followed a week in the Drakensberg, climbing to the top of Mont-aux-Sources with two fellow botanists, Ms. Verdoorn and Ms. Forbes. A final flurry of collecting at Botha's Hill near Durban, and Port Elizabeth, saw the end of a fruitful visit.

List of selected publications

Books 
  Volume 1: Dicotyledonae 1926, Volume 2: Monocotyledonae 1934.
  Volume 1: Dicotyledonae at Google Books, Volume 2: Monocotyledonae at Internet Archive Available to borrow: 2 vols
 
 The Genera of Flowering Plants (Oxford, Vol.1 (1964), Vol.2 (1967), Vol. 3 (posthumously)) at * Common Wild Flowers (1945) * More Common Wild Flowers (1948) * Uncommon Wild Flowers (1950) * British Wild Flowers (1955) * The Story of Plants with R. Melville * A Botanist in Southern Africa (London, 1946) * Flora of West Tropical Africa with Dr John McEwen Dalziel /keytofamiliesoff00hutc/page/n5 Internet Archive
 Evolution and Phylogeny of Flowering Plants (1969)

Articles

See also
 Hutchinson system

References

1884 births
1972 deaths
English botanists
English taxonomists
Fellows of the Royal Society
Fellows of the Linnean Society of London
Officers of the Order of the British Empire
Veitch Memorial Medal recipients
Victoria Medal of Honour recipients
Linnean Medallists
Botanists active in Kew Gardens